Ready for Freddie is an album by trumpeter Freddie Hubbard, released on the Blue Note label in 1962 as BLP 4085 and BST 84085. In 2003, it was remastered and issued on CD with the addition of two alternate takes. It contains performances by Hubbard, Bernard McKinney, Wayne Shorter, McCoy Tyner, Art Davis and Elvin Jones.

Reception
The album was identified by Scott Yanow in his AllMusic essay "Hard Bop" as one of the 17 Essential Hard Bop Recordings.

Track listing
 "Arietis" – 6:41
 "Weaver of Dreams" (Jack Elliott, Victor Young) – 6:35
 "Marie Antoinette" (Wayne Shorter) – 6:38
 "Birdlike" – 10:15
 "Crisis" – 11:33
 "Arietis" [alternate take] – 5:51
 "Marie Antoinette" [alternate take] (Shorter) – 6:15

All compositions by Freddie Hubbard except as indicated

Personnel
 Freddie Hubbard – trumpet
 Bernard McKinney – euphonium
 Wayne Shorter – tenor saxophone
 McCoy Tyner – piano
 Art Davis – double bass
 Elvin Jones – drums

Charts

References

1962 albums
Freddie Hubbard albums
Blue Note Records albums
Albums produced by Alfred Lion
Albums recorded at Van Gelder Studio